Moraxella nonliquefaciens is a Gram-negative bacterium in the genus Moraxella, which was isolated from the upper respiratory tract of humans. M. nonliquefaciens occasionally causes disease.

References

External links
Type strain of Moraxella nonliquefaciens at BacDive -  the Bacterial Diversity Metadatabase

Moraxellaceae
Bacteria described in 1939